Truck Fire-Fighting Airfield Crash Rescue 2 Tonne 6x4 Mark 2 Range Rover, a rapid response vehicle used by the Royal Air Force and the Royal Navy.

The TACR2 is a six-wheeled Range Rover based successor to the TACR1 which was built on a Land Rover Series II or III.

The TACR2 was built on the Carmichael Commando chassis. This is a 775mm (30.5inch) six-wheeled rear extension of the classic Range Rover. It uses the Range Rover drivetrain, with the two leading axles (front axle and original rear axle) powered through the Range Rover permanent four wheel drive transfer case. The new rear axle is an unpowered trailer, using similar coil spring suspension. The chassis was converted by Carmichael from a standard Range Rover chassis supplied by Land Rover in the form of a drivable chassis cab, therefore most components were standard Range Rover. Some TACR2s have been converted to six wheel drive. 
This is usually achieved by welding an input cone mounting flange to the rear of the middle axle in place of the diff pan, attaching a second, rearward facing 'input' cone (as an output cone), linked by a short prop to the input cone of the rear axle, this and the diff and diff pan need to be turned over (so the crown wheel is on the opposite side to the middle axle's crown wheel) to maintain correct rotation. This should be used in conjunction with free wheeling hubs to prevent diff wind-up when driving on-road or tarmac.

TACR2 bodies were built by Carmichael, Gloster Saro (most) and a small number by HCB Angus.

External links
Sixappealwheel group photo album with many TACR2 pictures
Range Rover Conversions

Fire service vehicles
Land Rover vehicles